Chil may refer to:

 A character in The Jungle Book; see List of The Jungle Book characters#Mowgli's adventures
 Chil, Iran, a village in Sistan and Baluchestan Province, Iran
 Chil, Hormozgan, a village in Hormozgan Province, Iran